Metrosideros florida may refer to:

 Metrosideros florida Sm., now considered a synonym of Metrosideros fulgens Sol. ex Gaertn
 Metrosideros florida Hook.f., now considered a synonym of Metrosideros robusta A.Cunn.